Jonathan Patrick Braga (born 19 June 1969) is a United States Army lieutenant general serving as the commanding general of United States Army Special Operations Command since 13 August 2021. He previously served as a deputy commanding general of United States Army Pacific from August 2020 to July 2021, as commander of Special Operations Command Pacific from July 2018 to August 2020, and before that as operations director of Operation Inherent Resolve, the official name for the US war on ISIS.

On 12 August 2021, he was promoted to lieutenant general and assumed command of the United States Army Special Operations Command one day later, succeeding Francis M. Beaudette.

Military career 
Braga graduated from the United States Military Academy at West Point, New York with a B.S. degree in national security public affairs, and was commissioned as a second lieutenant into the Infantry Branch in 1991. His first assignment was rifle platoon leader with 2nd Infantry Division, Eighth Army in South Korea followed with service at 11th Armored Cavalry Regiment at Fort Irwin, California. He then attended Army Special Forces Qualification Course and served with the 7th Special Forces Group from 1995-2001 as Operational Detachment-A commander and Company Executive Commander. Braga completed the selection course for assignment to 1st Special Forces Operational Detachment-Delta at Fort Bragg, NC. He would serve numerous leadership positions as squadron operations officer and troop commander with deployments to Operation Iraqi Freedom till 2005.  Braga earned a master's degree from the Naval Command and Staff College, Naval War College in 2006 and transferred to Joint Special Operations Command (JSOC) in Washington, DC. Braga returned to United States Army Special Operations Command at Fort Bragg in 2008 and served as operations officer, Squadron Commander and Deputy Unit Commander.

His most recent assignments include: Army War College Special Operations Fellow at the Naval Postgraduate School, Garrison Commander of the National Training Center in Fort Irwin, CA from 2013-2015; Chief of Staff at Joint Special Operations Command from 2015-2017 and Director of Operations, Combined Joint Task Force—Operation Inherent Resolve (CJTF-OIR) in Iraq. Braga assumed command as Commander, Special Operations Command, Pacific on 27 July 2018.

Operation Inherent Resolve 
Braga praised the collaboration with Kurdish troops on the ground.

Awards and decorations

Personal life
Braga is the son of Reid and Mary Braga.

Braga is married to Melanie Lynn Rohrbaugh of Apple Valley, California. They have five children. Braga and Rohrbaugh were married on 4 September 1999 at Fort Bragg.

References 

1969 births
Living people
People from Attleboro, Massachusetts
United States Military Academy alumni
Military personnel from Massachusetts
United States Army Rangers
College of Naval Command and Staff alumni
Recipients of the Legion of Merit
United States Army generals
Recipients of the Defense Superior Service Medal
Recipients of the Distinguished Service Medal (US Army)